The following radio stations broadcast on AM frequency 720 kHz: 720 AM is a United States clear-channel frequency.  WGN Chicago and KOTZ Kotzebue, Alaska, share Class A status of 720 kHz.

Argentina
 LV10 in Mendoza
 LRA 59 in Gobernador Gregores, Santa Cruz

Brazil
 ZYH 281 in Itacoatiara, Amazonas
 ZYI 390 in Dourados, Mato Grosso do Sul
 ZYI 390 in Recife, Pernambuco
 ZYK 276 in Porto Alegre, Rio Grande do Sul
 ZYK 575 in Casa Branca, São Paulo
 ZYK 722 in Olímpia, São Paulo
 ZYK 718 in Cruzeiro, São Paulo

Bolivia
 CP148 in Chulumani
 CP27 in La Paz

China 
 CNR Business Radio in Dalian
 CNR China Rural Radio in Huabei region

Cyprus
 ZJM-2 in Zakaki

Denmark

Greenland
 OXF in Simiutaq

Ethiopia
 ETEBS in Legedadi

Germany
 Langenberg transmission tower in Langenberg, Velbert

India
 VUM in Chennai (formerly Madras)

Indonesia
 8FV200 in Ambon
 PM2B... in Jakarta
 PM4... in Majenang
 PM8DCV in Pinrang
 PM4... in Semarang
 PM3B... in Serang
 PM8CAN in Talangpadang 
 PM3E... in Waingapu 
 PM7CLV in Wonosobo

Jamaica
 6YR in Naggo Head

Japan
 JOAR in Kumano, Mie
 JOZF in Takayama, Gifu
 JOZF in Kamioka, Gifu
 JOIL in Kitakyushu, Fukuoka

Mexico
 XEDE-AM in Arteaga, Coahuila
 XEJCC-AM in Cd. Juarez, Chihuahua
 XEJAGC-AM in Juan Aldama, Zacatecas
 XEKN-AM in Huetamo, Michoacán
 XEQZ-AM in San Juan de los Lagos, Jalisco

New Zealand
 ZL4YZ in Dacre

Peru
 OAX2J in Trujillo

Portugal
 CSA4 in Azurara
 CSA302 in Castelo Branco 
 CSA212 in Elvas 
 CSA303 in Faro 
 CSA204 in Guarda 
 CSA235 in Mirandela

Russia
 RW677 in Yuzhno-Sakhalinsk

Spain

Canary Islands
 EFJ57 in Santa Cruz de Tenerife

Suriname
 PZX26 in Uitkijk

Sweden
 SCL in Kiruna

Thailand
 HSND-AM in Sattahip

United Kingdom
 BBC Radio 4 in London and Northern Ireland

United States
Stations in bold are clear-channel stations.

Vietnam
 3WT-25 in Hué

References

Lists of radio stations by frequency